Khlong Chan is a neighbourhood in Bangkok, also a khwaeng (sub-district) of Bang Kapi District, Bangkok.

Toponymy
Khlong Chan is the name of a tributary of Khlong Saen Saep canal. The longest khlong (canal) in Thailand that flows from the downtown Bangkok to the eastern part at province of Chachoengsao which flows through the area of Bang Kapi.

The name Khlong Chan means a canal filled with chan (Millettia brandisiana) trees. Because this area in the past there were chan plants lined on both sides of the canal.

Geography
Khlong Chan is an area in the southeast of Bangkok and is the northern part of Bang Kapi District.

The area bounded by other areas (from the north clockwise): Nawamin in Bueng Kum District, Khlong Kum in Bueng Kum District, Hua Mak in its district, Phlabphla in Wang Thonglang District, and Wang Thonglang in Wang Thonglang District, with Lat Phrao in Lat Phrao District.

Places
Bang Kapi District Office
Happy Land
The Mall Bangkapi
Makro Lat Phrao
Tawanna Market
Vejthani Hospital
National Housing Authority

References

Neighbourhoods of Bangkok
Bang Kapi district
Subdistricts of Bangkok